David Stephenson (born 1955) is an American-Australian fine art photographer known for his representations of the sublime. His photographic subjects have included landscapes from America to Australia, the Arctic and Antarctica, the Southern Ocean, European sacred architecture, and day- and nighttime skyscapes. He has lived in Tasmania since 1982.

Early life and education 
David Stephenson was born in 1955 in Washington, D.C., the third child of two scientists, Elizabeth W. and John L. Stephenson. While attending public schools in suburban Maryland, he took Saturday classes at the Corcoran School of the Arts and Design under artists including Juan Downey. Drawn to nature and the environment from an early age, he was inspired by the writings and environmental advocacy of John Muir. His love of the mountains drew him to Colorado, where he began undergraduate studies in the sciences and humanities at the University of Colorado Boulder in 1973. Classes with Gary Metz stimulated his growing interest in photography, and he completed a BFA in studio art and a BA in art history in 1979. In Colorado he also met Robert Adams, who lived in nearby Longmont and was an early mentor. He moved to Albuquerque in 1979 to start graduate studies at the University of New Mexico, working under Thomas Barrow, Beaumont Newhall, and Van Deren Coke. Photographing across the American Southwest and California from 1979 to 1981 with a large format camera, and inspired by artistic precedents from Carleton Watkins to Robert Smithson, he produced his first major body of work, New Monuments, which focussed on industrial structures in the landscape. After completing a Master of Arts in 1980, he was awarded a National Endowment for the Arts grant, which allowed him to travel to Alaska in 1981 to photograph the newly completed Trans-Alaska Pipeline. Responding to the Pipeline’s linearity and influenced by 19th century photographers such as Watkins, he first worked with panoramic composites in Alaska, a pictorial strategy he would return to periodically for subsequent series. Stephenson completed a Master of Fine Arts at the University of New Mexico in 1982 with an exhibition of the Alaskan panoramas, and a dissertation on the 19th century photographers of the transcontinental railroad. In 2001 he was awarded a PhD in Fine Arts from the University of Tasmania.

Work 
Stephenson moved to Australia in 1982 to take up a junior teaching position at the University of Tasmania School of Art, at the encouragement of Thomas Joshua Cooper, who had been teaching a summer school there. Agreeing to stay only for two years, in 1984 he was made a tenured faculty member and led the photography program at the school, along with later positions as postgraduate coordinator and research coordinator, until his retirement from teaching in 2013.

Stephenson has worked on many long-term overlapping projects in his pursuit of the photographic representation of the sublime in time and space, using a variety of medium format and large format cameras and film types, and more recently digital photography. An exploration of the relationship of photography to time has been a recurrent theme in his work, both through the use of long exposures, and the compositing of sequential exposures. His photographic series include New Monuments (1979-81), Composite Landscapes (1982-88), Clouds (1990-93), Vast (1990-91), The Ice (1991-92), Domes (1993-2005), Vaults (2003-09), Star Drawings (1995-2009), Drowned (2001-02), Marking Time (2003-05), Light Cities (2005-13), Time Slice (2014-22), and Survivors (2019-22).

Publications 
Stars / photographs by David Stephenson; essay by Keith F. Davis, Julie Saul Gallery, New York, 1999. 
Skeletons / photographs by David Stephenson; essay by Greg French, Space and Light, Fern Tree, 2003. ISBN 0975039504 
Visions of Heaven: The Dome in European Architecture, Princeton Architectural Press, New York, 2005. ISBN 1-56898-549-5
Heavenly Vaults: From Romanesque to Gothic in European Architecture, Princeton Architectural Press, New York, 2009. ISBN 978-1-56898-840-5

Exhibitions 
David Stephenson’s photographs have been presented in hundreds of group exhibitions and over sixty solo exhibitions including:

 1983: Australian Perspecta 1983, Art Gallery of New South Wales, Sydney
 1988: Australian Photography: the 1980's, Australian National Gallery, Canberra
 1992: Location, Australian Centre for Contemporary Art, Melbourne
 1993: David Stephenson: The Ice, Art Gallery of New South Wales, Sydney and Australian Centre for Contemporary Art, Melbourne
 1994: Landed: Landscape Art in Australia, 1960-90, Australian National Gallery, Canberra
 1994: An American Century of Photography: From Dry-Plate to Digital, Nelson-Atkins Museum of Art, Kansas City, and international tour
 1998: Sublime Space: David Stephenson Photographs 1989-98, National Gallery of Victoria, Melbourne
 1999: Tempus Fugit/Time Flies, Nelson-Atkins Museum of Art, Kansas City
 2001: Space + Light: David Stephenson Photographs, 1982-1996, Tasmanian Museum and Art Gallery, Hobart
 2001: Starlight: David Stephenson Photographs, Cleveland Museum of Art
 2002: Fieldwork: Australian Art 1968-2002, National Gallery of Victoria, Melbourne
 2006: Symétries sublimes, photographies de David Stephenson, Centre Culturel Calouste Gulbenkian, Paris
 2007: Cross Currents: Focus on Contemporary Australian Art, Museum of Contemporary Art, Sydney
 2010: In the Balance, Museum of Contemporary Art, Sydney
 2011: Transcendence: Photographs by David Stephenson, Monash Gallery of Art, Melbourne
 2011: Luminous World – Contemporary Art from the Wesfarmers Collection, Art Gallery of Western Australia, Perth
 2013: Australia: land and landscape, Royal Academy of Arts, London; organised with National Gallery of Art, Canberra
 2014 Perduti nel paesaggio/Lost in Landscape, Museo di Arte Moderna e Contemporanea di Trento e Rovereto, Italy
 2015: The Photograph and Australia, Art Gallery of Art Gallery of New South Wales, Sydney
 2017: David Stephenson: Human Landscapes, Art Gallery of New South Wales, Sydney
 2018: Noorderlicht International Photofestival IN VIVO | the nature of nature, Museum Belvédère, Heerenveen, The Netherlands
 2019: Civilization: The Way We Live Now, National Gallery of Victoria, Melbourne

Collections 
Stephenson’s photographs are held in many public collections, including:

Ackland Art Museum

Art Gallery of New South Wales

Art Gallery of South Australia

George Eastman Museum

Library of Congress

Metropolitan Museum of Art

Monash Gallery of Art, Melbourne

Museum of Contemporary Art Australia

Museum of Fine Arts, Houston

Museum of Modern Art

National Gallery of Australia

National Gallery of Victoria

Nelson-Atkins Museum of Art

Nevada Museum of Art
Queensland Art Gallery & Gallery of Modern Art

Awards 
1980, National Endowment for the Arts Emerging Artist Fellowship
1992, 1996 Australia Council for the Arts Grants
2000, Australian Research Council Grant
2008-09, Australia Council for the Arts Fellowship
2014-17, Australian Research Council Discovery Project
2021, Hadley's Art Prize

References

Further reading 
Lynne Andrews: Antarctic eye : the visual journey, Mount Rumney, 2007. ISBN 9780646478395

Judy Annear: The Photograph and Australia, Art Gallery of New South Wales, Sydney, 2015. ISBN 9781741741162

Jorge Calado: A Prova de Agua/Waterproof, Edition Stemmle, Zurich, 1998. ISBN 9789728495053

Jorge Calado: David Stephenson: Symetries Sublime/Sublime Symmetries, Centre Culturel Calouste Gulbenkian, Paris, 2006. ISBN 972-8462-44-1

Jorge Calado: Ingenuidades: Fotografia e Engenharia 1846-2006, Fundação Calouste Gulbenkian, Lisbon, 2006. ISBN 9789723111750

Peter Conrad: At home in Australia, National Gallery of Australia and Thames & Hudson, Canberra, 2003. ISBN 978-0500511411

Isobel Crombie: "Foreword" in David Stephenson: Heavenly Vaults: From Romanesque to Gothic in European Architecture, Princeton Architectural Press, New York, 2009. ISBN 978-1-56898-840-5

Keith F. Davis: An American Century of Photography: From Dry-Plate to Digital, Hallmark, Kansas City, 1994. ISBN 9780810919648

Keith F. Davis: An American Century of Photography: From Dry Plate to Digital (2nd Edition, Revised and Enlarged), Abrams, New York, 1998. ISBN 0-8109-6378-7

Keith F. Davis: "Admiration and awe - David Stephenson and the photographic sublime", in David Stephenson: Visions of Heaven: The Dome in European Architecture, Princeton Architectural Press, New York, 2005. ISBN 1-56898-549-5

Helen Ennis: Australian Photography: The 1980's, Australian National Gallery, Canberra, and Melbourne Oxford University Press, Oxford, Auckland, New York, 1988 ISBN 9780642081599

Helen Ennis: Photography and Australia, Reaktion, London, 2007. ISBN 9781861893239

Roslynn D. Haynes: Tasmanian Visions: Landscapes in Writing, Art, and Photography, Polymath Press, Tasmania, 2006. ISBN 097757380X

Isabel Hesketh: “David Stephenson”, in Rachel Kent: In the Balance: Art for a Changing World, Museum of Contemporary Art, Sydney, 2010. ISBN 9781921034459

Melissa Miles: The Language of Light and Dark – Light and Place in Australian Photography, McGill-Queen's University Press, Montreal & Kingston and Power Publications, Sydney, 2015. ISBN 978-0-7735-4550-2

Daniel Palmer: “David Stephenson”, chapter in John Stringer: Cross Currents: Focus on Contemporary Australian Art, Museum of Contemporary Art, Sydney, 2007. ISBN 9781921034206

Daniel Palmer: “David Stephenson”, chapter in Blair French and Daniel Palmer: Twelve Australian Photo-Artists, Piper Press, Sydney, 2009. ISBN 9780975190173

Jan Schall, editor: Tempus Fugit: Time Flies, Nelson-Atkins Museum of Art, Kansas City, and University of Washington, Seattle, 2001. ISBN 9780942614329

David Stephenson: "Marks in the landscape: Notes 1979-1991", in Jerry de Gryse and Andrew Sant, ed: Our Common Ground, a celebration of art, place & environment, Australian Institute of Landscape Architects and University of Tasmania, Hobart, 1994. ISBN 0 909947 05 8

Susan Van Wyk: Sublime Space: David Stephenson Photographs, 1989-98, National Gallery of Victoria, Melbourne, 1998.

Susan Van Wyk: “David Stephenson - The Ice”, in Charles Green and Jason Smith: Fieldwork: Australian Art 1968-2002, National Gallery of Victoria, Melbourne, 2002. ISBN 0 7241 0213 2

External links 

1955 births
20th-century American photographers
20th-century Australian photographers
21st-century American photographers
21st-century Australian photographers
American expatriates in Australia
Artists from Tasmania
Fine art photographers
Landscape photographers
Living people
Photographers from Washington, D.C.
Photography academics
University of Colorado Boulder alumni
University of New Mexico alumni
Academic staff of the University of Tasmania